The Leyland Band is a brass band based in Lancashire in the UK.

History
The Leyland Band was established in 1946 in the heart of industrial Lancashire as the Leyland Motors Band, taking its name from the world famous truck and bus company. Now an independent group of some thirty musicians, the Band has retained its local connection and now proudly bears the name of its home town.

The last twenty five years of the Bands existence has been the most consistently successful in its history. After a meteoric rise through the various sections, the Band has witnessed scores of prize awards at all the major competitions in the brass band arena.

Leyland Band has also rightly earned its reputation as an unrivalled concert entertainer by producing dynamic and unique performances both at home and abroad. Leyland Band has always fostered a strong sense of originality. In 1980, the ensemble was the first western brass band to tour Japan, a country it revisited along with South Korea in the 1990s. In the last decade, four coast to coast tours of the United States of America are testament to the Band's far-reaching appeal. Numerous performances on continental Europe have been a feature of the band's work on the concert platform. It has also had great success at the Brass in Concert Championship of which it is the current title holder.

Leyland Band has appeared in numerous television and radio broadcasts, specifically for the Granada Band of the Year, BBC Radio 3 and Listen to the Band. It has an impressive discography and has recorded many commercial CDs.

Previous Names
 Leyland Motors Band (1946 - 1979)
 Leyland Vehicles Band (1979 - 1988)
 Leyland DAF Band (1988 - 1992)
 BNFL (Leyland) Band (1992 - 1997)
 JJB Sports Leyland Band (1997 - 2000)

Contest successes
 Champion Band of Great Britain: 2005
 British Open Champions: 1994
 All England Masters: 1989, 1992, 2003
 Brass in Concert Champions: 1989, 1991, 1992, 1997, 2011
 North West Regional Champions: 1982, 1990, 1991, 1993, 1994, 2004, 2005, 2012, 2013
 Grand Shield Champions (Spring Festival): 1981, 2008

Conductors

References

External links
 Leyland Band official site

Musical groups established in 1946
Organisations based in Lancashire
British brass bands
Leyland Motors
Leyland, Lancashire